Lazar Zličić (born 7 February 1997) is a Serbian professional footballer who plays as a midfielder for Slovenian club Mura. He is the older brother of Miloš Zličić.

Club career

Vojvodina
Born in Novi Sad, Zličić started playing football with local club Veternik at the age of 6, and later moved to Vojvodina, where he passed all youth categories. After his youth career, he was loaned to Proleter Novi Sad in the summer of 2015 on dual registration. He made his SuperLiga debut for Vojvodina under coach Milan Kosanović in the 17th round of the 2015–16 season against Radnik Surdulica, where he also scored a goal.

Playing for Proleter Novi Sad as a loaned player, Zličić made 18 Serbian First League appearances and also scored one goal, against Sloga Petrovac na Mlavi. He was also nominated for the man of the match against Inđija, played on 10 April 2016.

At the beginning of the 2016–17 season, Zličić made five appearances in UEFA Europa League qualifying phase, all as a back-up player; he provided an assist to Nikola Trujić in a match against Bokelj. He scored two goals in a 5–0 win against Spartak Subotica, played on 28 August 2016 in the seventh round of the Serbian SuperLiga. Zličić also scored in the first round of the Serbian Cup against Bežanija, played on 21 September of the same year. Zličić started his first match on the field in the 19th round of the 2016–17 Serbian SuperLiga against Napredak Kruševac, when he also scored a goal.

Voždovac
On 1 September 2018, Zličić signed a three-year contract with Voždovac. On 4 February 2019, he suffered an anterior cruciate ligament injury in a friendly match against Japanese club Shonan Bellmare. As a result, he had surgery later that month.

Kisvárda
On 1 August 2020, Zličić joined Hungarian club Kisvárda.

Career statistics

Notes

References

External links
 Lazar Zličić stats at utakmica.rs 
 
 

1997 births
Living people
Footballers from Novi Sad
Association football midfielders
Serbian footballers
Serbia youth international footballers
Serbia under-21 international footballers
FK Vojvodina players
FK Proleter Novi Sad players
FK Voždovac players
Kisvárda FC players
NŠ Mura players
Serbian First League players
Serbian SuperLiga players
Nemzeti Bajnokság I players
Kazakhstan Premier League players
Slovenian PrvaLiga players
Serbian expatriate footballers
Expatriate footballers in Hungary
Serbian expatriate sportspeople in Hungary
Expatriate footballers in Kazakhstan
Serbian expatriate sportspeople in Kazakhstan
Expatriate footballers in Slovenia
Serbian expatriate sportspeople in Slovenia